Chitarpur (also written as Chitar Pur) is a census town in the Chitarpur CD block in the Ramgarh subdivision of the Ramgarh district in the Indian state of Jharkhand.

Etymology
The word Chitarpur is derived from Era-1700 Ruling Maharaja's  daughter Chitra Devi. As the village and Nearby Areas were given to her by his father.

Geography

Location
It has an average elevation of 364 metres (1167 feet).

Area overview
Ramgarh has a vibrant coal-mining sector. The map alongside provides links to five operational areas of Central Coalfields spread across South Karanpura Coalfield, Ramgarh Coalfield and West Bokaro Coalfield. Four of the six CD blocks in the district have coal mines – Patratu, Ramgarh, Mandu and Chitarpur. The high concentration of census towns in these blocks are noticeable on the map. Only two blocks, Gola and Dulmi, are totally rural areas. Ramgarh district lies in the central part of the Chota Nagpur Plateau. The Damodar valley covers most of the district. The forested areas in highlands to the north and the south of the valley can be seen in the map (mark the shaded areas). "Chotanagpur has a charm of its own… The entire area forms one of the most charming series of views imaginable. The far-off hills in the background in exquisite tints of blue or purple as the light falls, the nearer hills picturesquely shaped and luxuriant in every shade of green with their bold escarpments in black or grey, and the brown plains below furnishing their quota of colours."

Note: The map alongside presents some of the notable locations in the district. All places marked in the map are linked in the larger full screen map.

Demographics
According to the 2011 Census of India, Chitar Pur had a total population of 22,837, of which 11,993 (53%) were males and 10,844 (47%) were females. Population in the age range 0-6 years was 3,578. The total number of literate persons in Chitar Pur was 15,652 (81.27% of the population over 6 years).

Civic administration

CD block HQ
The headquarters of Chitarpur CD block is located at Chitarpur town.

Infrastructure
According to the District Census Handbook 2011, Ramgarh, Chitarpur covered an area of 6.9372 km2. Among the civic amenities, it had 5 km roads with both open and closed drains, the protected water supply involved tapwater from treated sources, uncovered well, overhead tank. It had 3,330 domestic electric connections. Among the medical facilities, it had 1 hospital, 1 dispensary, 1 health centre, 6 family welfare centres, 6 maternity and child welfare centres, 4 maternity homes, 6 nursing homes, 2 medicine shops. Among the educational facilities it had 3 primary schools, 2 middle schools, 1 secondary school, 1 senior secondary school, the nearest general degree college at Gola 5 km away. Two important commodities it produced were steel box and steel almirah. It had the branch office of 1 nationalised bank.

Economy
Rajrappa open cast mine and Rajrappa washery are operational under Rajrappa Area of Central Coalfields Limited.

Transport

Badki Pona Railway Station:

Badki Pona is the only railway Station in the Village.
Zone: SE RAILWAY/RANCHI.

Roads:

NH-23 Road is the major means of transportation in the Village. Central Government of Highways Authority has planned to change it into a four-lane road which connects to NH-33 towards its east and NH-2 on the west

Birsa Munda Airport: (51 km) States Capital Ranchi is the nearest Airport. Direct links are available to prominent cities such as Delhi, Patna, Mumbai, Bangalore and Kolkata.

There are also bus services that run from Ranchi to Kolkata which go via Chitarpur.

Places of interest

 Historical Architectures :

 Chitarpur Jama Masjid : Situated In the heart of Chitarpur Village. This Mosque was built in 1700s. It contains magnificent Mughal Art and Structures.

 Chaitarpur shivalaya mandir : Situated In Shivalaya Road of Chitarpur.

Rajrappa Temple: It is situated 10 kilometers away from Chitarpur.

.

Education
Chitarpur Village holds numbers of private & government schools and Colleges .

 Chitarpur High School : School was built in 1950

 Chitarpur Girls Urdu High School (Banat) : School was established at around 1980

 D.A.V Public School C.C.L : Is The Only C.B.S.E English Medium school Situated Nearby

 Chitarpur Inter College : College was established in 1982

 Government Engineering College Ramgarh :  Is the only Technical Institute situated nearby and has been recently inaugurated and affiliated by AICTE. Run and Managed by Techno India Group.

References

Cities and towns in Ramgarh district